= Freightera Logistics =

Freightera Logistics Inc.
- Company type: Private Company
- Industry: Logistics
- Founded: May 2014
- Founder: Eric Beckwitt
- Headquarters: Vancouver, Canada
- Areas served: Canada, United States
- Products: Freightera Marketplace, Go Green: Low Emission Freight Marketplace, Link2Rail
- Website: www.freightera.com

Freightera Logistics Inc. is a Vancouver-based business-to-business (B2B) online freight marketplace that enables businesses to obtain road or rail transport quotes from North American carriers and make direct shipment bookings.

== History ==
Freightera was founded in May 2014 by Eric Beckwitt, a former GIS analyst, and his wife, Zhenya Beck. Motivated by their son's severe asthma caused by air pollution, the couple relocated from Northern California to Canada in search of cleaner air. Their personal experiences inspired them to create a platform aimed at reducing emissions in the freight industry.

Initially, the company connected freight trucks with businesses across Canadian routes. It later expanded to include rail services and lower-energy-emission carriers certified by the SmartWay program, a joint initiative by the U.S. Environmental Protection Agency and Environment Canada.

== Operations ==
As of 2025, Freightera serves over 22,500 businesses and offers access to more than 20 billion freight lanes across North America. The platform provides instant freight quotes from hundreds of national and local carriers, allowing users to compare options based on price, transit time, and environmental impact.

Freightera's technology includes features such as Rate Defence™, which protects shippers from surprise charges, and API integrations for automated freight shipping.

== Environmental initiatives ==
Freightera emphasises sustainability through its “Go Green: Low Emission Freight Marketplace,” promoting carriers that are part of emission-reduction programmes like SmartWay or utilise lower-emission rail for long hauls. The company reports that about 80 percent of the time, the carrier offering the lowest price also provides the most fuel-efficient and low-emission service.

Freightera's CEO, Eric Beckwitt, has contributed to global discussions on sustainable freight. He authored “A Green Future for Freight” for the G7 Summit in Japan and presented at the UN Climate Change Conference (COP 22) in Marrakech, Morocco.

== Funding ==
Freightera has raised a total of USD 4.1 million in funding over multiple rounds. Investors include Decathlon Capital Partners and Plug and Play Tech Center.

== Awards and recognition ==
- 2019 Clean50 Award – CEO Eric Beckwitt was honoured for outstanding contributions to sustainability and clean capitalism in Canada.
- 2020 Deloitte Technology Fast 50™ Award – Recognised as one of Canada’s fastest-growing technology companies.
- 2021 DotCom Magazine Impact Company of the Year Award – Honoured for significant impact and innovation.
- 2022 Report on Business Changemakers Award – CEO Eric Beckwitt was named one of Canada’s 50 Changemakers for his innovative approach to reducing shipping costs and CO_{2} emissions.
